{{DISPLAYTITLE:Lambda1 Sculptoris}}

Lambda1 Sculptoris, Latinised from λ1 Sculptoris, is a double star system in the southern constellation of Sculptor. It is close to the lower limit of visibility to the naked eye, with a combined apparent visual magnitude of +6.05. Based upon an annual parallax shift of 6.89 mas as measured from Earth, it is located roughly 470 light-years from the Sun. At that distance, the visual magnitude is diminished by an extinction factor of 0.026 due to interstellar dust.

The brighter star, component A, has a visual magnitude of 6.6, while the secondary, component B, is magnitude 7.0. As of 2000, the pair had an angular separation of 0.737 arcsecond along a position angle of 14.0°. The mass ratio is 0.609, meaning the secondary is only 60.9% as massive as the primary.

References

B-type main-sequence stars
Double stars
Sculptoris, Lambda-1
Sculptor (constellation)
004065
003356
0185
A-type main-sequence stars
Durchmusterung objects